Nirupam Sen Chowdhary (born 23 October 1990) is an Indian first-class cricketer who plays for Tripura.

References

External links
 

1990 births
Living people
Indian cricketers
Tripura cricketers
Cricketers from Tripura
People from Agartala
Wicket-keepers